Iver  is a large civil parish in Buckinghamshire, England. In addition to the central clustered village, the parish includes the residential neighbourhoods of Iver Heath and Richings Park.

Geography, transport and economy
Part of the 43-square-mile Colne Valley regional park, with woods, lakes and land by the Grand Union Canal. Most of the open land is classified as Metropolitan Green Belt.

Surrounding the Ivers are neighbouring villages and towns of Fulmer, Denham, Gerrards Cross and Wexham. Also nearby are, Colnbrook and Langley in Berkshire and Uxbridge, Cowley, Yiewsley and West Drayton in Hillingdon. 

The Ivers are well connected, with public transport and motorway links.

Nearest motorway links are Junction 15 and 16 M25 motorway, Junction 4 and 5 M4 motorway, including the Thorney Interchange, whereby to the North of the Ivers is Junction 1 M40 motorway as well as the A40, which is parallel to the M40.

Two significant employers in the parish are the Ridgeway trading and warehousing estate in Richings Park and Pinewood Studios in Iver Heath.

History
In the Domesday Book of 1086 the whole area was recorded as Evreham or homestead by the brow of a hill and it was in the possession of a man called Robert Doiley.
 In 1351 the area was granted a Royal charter to hold a weekly market. This charter was confirmed 110 years later in 1461.

Iver
Iver village on the Uxbridge to Langley road has a pre-Domesday foundation and Neolithic pottery fragments and other artefacts have been discovered. The village church has shards of a Saxon window, and elements dating from the 15th century, 16th century and 17th century can be seen. The village has numerous houses from the 16th and 17th centuries.

Iver Heath
Iver Heath is the location of Heatherden Hall, a Victorian estate with spectacular grounds. It was purchased by Lt. Col. Grant Morden, a Canadian financier, who transformed the mansion by adding a huge ballroom and Turkish bath. During the 1930s it became a retreat and private meeting place for politicians and diplomats. The agreement to form the Irish Free State was signed at Heatherden Hall. The Church of St Margaret was built in 1862. Iver Heath itself is centred on a triangle of roads. The village post office is on the Slough Road to the south, while a parade of shops used to be found along Church Road to the north. Slough Road and Church Road are connected by Bangors Road North to the east.

Richings Park
Richings Park was once the estate of Lord Bathurst. Richings Park mansion, very briefly the home of RAF Bomber Command, was destroyed during World War II, and its site is now a residential area with its own shopping facilities. The cellars of the house are still visible in fields now overlooking the M4.

Black Park Country Park & Langley Park Country Park
Black Park adjoins the Pinewood Studio complex. Due to its proximity to Pinewood Studios, Black Park was used for outdoor sequences in some of Hammer's Dracula films, a number of Carry On films, the Gerry Anderson Sci Fi series UFO and in the 1964 James Bond film Goldfinger.

To the south, Black Park is separated from Langley Park by the A412 / Uxbridge Road. Langley Park covers 130 acres (0.53 km2) and is known for its rhododendron and azalea-filled Temple Gardens. 

There's also a viewpoint whereby Windsor Castle can be seen in the midst.

Pinewood Studios

Pinewood Studios is a major British film studio to the immediate west of the developed land of Iver Heath, which is in all other respects residential.  The studios have hosted many productions from blockbuster films to UK television shows, commercials and pop music promos.  The Superman and James Bond film franchises have used the film studios which provides tours of its museum.

Pinewood was built on the estate of Heatherden Hall, a large, attractive Victorian house with spectacular grounds.  The Pinewood estate had previously been purchased by Lt. Col. Grant Morden, a Canadian financier and MP for Brentford and Chiswick.  He spent a fortune transforming the mansion into a showpiece home, adding refinements such as a huge ballroom, a Turkish bath and an indoor squash court.  Due to its seclusion, the house was used as a discreet meeting place for high-ranking politicians and diplomats.  Here the agreement for the Anglo-Irish Treaty was signed.  When Grant Morden died in 1934 the estate was purchased at auction by Charles Boot, who had recently inherited a large construction firm from his father, Henry Boot, who died in 1931.  Within twelve months Charles had formed a partnership with J. Arthur Rank, who transformed the mansion into the office building for a film studio complex.  He based his new studios on the latest Hollywood designs of that era.  Charles Boot named the complex Pinewood Film Studios, a reference to the many pine trees in the area.  The entrance to the studio is on Pinewood Road.

Activities and facilities

The Evreham Sports Centre
The Sports Centre is based in Iver, which is in the south of the District. The centre is run by Greenwich Leisure Limited. Facilities include a multi purpose sports hall, dance studio, lounge (with adjoining kitchen), sunbed, outdoor floodlit synthetic surface pitch, grass soccer pitches and a changing facility and fitness suite with equipment including a nautilus tread climber. The fitness suite contains pieces of equipment designed to be accessible to those persons with limited mobility.

Evreham Adult Learning Centre
Adjacent to the Sports Centre on the border of Iver Heath and Iver, this facility is a former secondary school which hosts independent and Council-run events and courses. These include Zumba, Slimming World, Pottery, Guitar and Woodwork. The venue also hosts the Tiny Toes Nursery and a Youth Centre.

Demography

Notable people
 Prince Edward, Duke of Kent, member of the British royal family, lived at Coppins, Iver (1935–1972).
 Prince Michael of Kent, Edward's younger brother, was born in Iver.
 Princess Victoria (1868–1935), daughter of Edward VII, lived in Iver 1925–1935.
 Matty Cash, is an English football player who grew up in the village. He currently is playing football for Aston Villa.
 Linford Christie, is a British sprinter who lived in Iver.
 Charles Richard Fairey Founder of Fairey aviation, the Fairey factory based in West London creators of the Swordfish. The family lived at Woodlands aka Elk Meadows in Iver Heath.
 John Fairey (1935–2009), aviator son of Charles Fairey (founder of the Fairey Aviation Company), was born in Iver.
 Chris Finnegan (1944–2009) British professional boxer of Irish descent born in Iver.
 Kevin Finnegan (1948–2008) British professional boxer of Irish descent born in Iver.
 James Gambier (1756–1833), notorious admiral of the Royal Navy, lived in Iver, his gardener invented the modern day pansy
 Julian Haviland (born 1930), former Political Editor of both ITN and The Times newspaper, was born in Iver Heath.
 Sid James (1913–1976) South African-born British actor and comedian.  Lived at Delaford Park, Iver.
 Daniel Johnson (born 26 August 1957) is a British journalist who is the founding editor of Standpoint, lived in Iver.
 Luke Oliver Johnson (born 2 February 1962), is a British serial entrepreneur, best known for his involvement with Pizza Express. He is a former chairman of the Royal Society of Arts and Channel 4. Lived in Iver.
 Paul Bede Johnson CBE  (born 2 November 1928) is an English journalist, historian, speechwriter and author. While associated with the political left in his early career, he is now a conservative popular historian. Lived in Iver.
 Brian Muir, sculptor of Darth Vader's helmet and armour and the Stormtrooper armour in Star Wars, lives in Iver.
 John Nash (1893–1977), painter of landscape and still-life, grew up in Iver.
 Paul Nash, WW1 and WW2 War Artist older brother of John Nash, buried in Langley in family plot.
 David Seaman Former England goalkeeper lived in Iver.
 Martin Secker (1882-1978) London publisher who rose to prominence in the 1920s and 30s, lived at Bridgefoot House, Iver.
 Oli White (born 26 January 1995), is an English YouTuber, actor and author, born in Iver.

See also
 List of civil parishes in England

References

External links

 Iver Parish Council

Villages in Buckinghamshire
Civil parishes in Buckinghamshire